Acalolepta coreanica is a species of beetle in the family Cerambycidae. It was described by Stephan von Breuning in 1956. It is known from South Korea.

References

Acalolepta
Beetles described in 1956